Michael J. Machat is an American artist, author, and pilot. He specializes in aviation art and was a frequent collaborator of R.E.G. Davies on the book series An Airline and its Aircraft. Several aviation museums have permanent collections of Machat's art.

Biography
Machat grew up in Long Island, New York. He would visit New York airports and draw airplanes as a kid. Machat began flying at age 16, exchanging his drawings and paintings for flying lessons. Although poor eyesight prevented Machat from commercial flying, he would eventually fly in more than 200 aircraft, including with the U.S. Air Force Test Pilot School, the Blue Angels, and NASA.

He attended Pratt Institute from 1965 to 1966, then served in the United States Air Force from 1967 to 1970 as an airman. Machat relocated to Los Angeles, California, where he graduated from California State University, Long Beach in 1979. Machat then began working at the Douglas Aircraft Company as a Staff Artist and Corporate Representative.

In 1984, Machat established his own aviation art studio. He was later elected as the first president of the American Society of Aviation Artists and was made a member of the Society of Illustrators, both of New York City and of Los Angeles. Machat previously served as president of Society of Illustrators of Los Angeles.

Art

Machat created a  mural of the P-38 for the Burbank Airport in 1996. One of Machat's drawings hangs on a wall at Bob Hope Airport in Burbank, California. Another, titled February 17, 1986, is owned by the Smithsonian National Air and Space Museum. Machat has also painted for the U.S. Air Force, where he once served on active duty. Machat painted a  mural titled The Golden Age of Flight for the Air Force Flight Test Center Museum. In 2012, Machat was selected to restore a painting by Douglas Ettridge of an Lockheed NF-104A at the Air Force Test Pilot School.

Machat was awarded the 11th Annual Combs Gates Award by the National Aviation Hall of Fame in 2013 for his mural, Fly DOUGLAS! In 2014, Machat completed a  mural, Flying Navy, for the Museum of Flying in Santa Monica, CA.

The Smithsonian National Air and Space Museum (District of Columbia), National Soaring Museum (Elmira, New York), and the National Museum of Naval Aviation (Pensacola, FL) have Machat's artwork in their permanent collections. Machat hosts a series of shows at the Museum of Flying, which began on June 8, 2019. He painted the mural Record Breakers for the museum and serves as curator at this museum.

Books
Machat illustrated a number of books by R. E. G. Davies, including:
Aeroflot
Pan Am
Delta
Lufthansa
TWA
Trans Brasil
Charles Lindbergh: An Airman, His Aircraft, and His Great Flights

He also authored several books, such as:
Painting Aviation's Legends
World's Fastest Four-engine Piston-powered Aircraft

References

External links
Presentation by Machat on painting The Golden Age of Flight mural
Time-lapse video of Machat painting Record Breakers mural
 (www.mikemachet.com)

1940s births
Living people
Date of birth missing (living people)
National Security Agency people
Aviators from New York (state)
American illustrators
Pratt Institute alumni
California State University, Long Beach alumni
United States Air Force airmen
Aviation artists